Vuolep Sårjåsjávrre is a lake which lies on the border between Norway and Sweden. The western part lies in Fauske Municipality in Nordland county, Norway, and the eastern part lies in Jokkmokk Municipality in Norrbotten County, Sweden.  The  lake lies just to the east of the large Blåmannsisen glacier and smaller neighboring lake Bajep Sårjåsjávrre (Upper Lake Sårjås).

See also
List of lakes in Norway

References

Lakes of Nordland
Norway–Sweden border
Fauske
International lakes of Europe
Lakes of Norrbotten County